Parkhurst Town Centre is a shopping centre located in the suburb of Parkhurst on the northern outskirts of Rockhampton, Queensland, Australia.

The shopping centre was constructed on the corner of the Bruce Highway and Boundary Road.

Due to Cyclone Marcia approvals for the construction of the complex were delayed, but land clearing of the old caravan park site was commenced in December 2014 prior to construction commencing in March 2016.

The Managing Director stated that all hardware and construction items would be supplied from local businesses, with the construction creating over 150 jobs and 200 jobs when completed.

The shopping centre is predicted to meet the needs of 14,000 residents in Parkhurst and surrounding suburbs.

It was announced in June 2016 that the construction of the Woolworths store had been completed and the work on the entire shopping centre was ahead of schedule, with the centre expected to be open in November 2016.

Woolworths was the first store in open in the centre, being officially opened at 5pm on 14 November 2016.  The official opening of the new Woolworths supermarket was attended by Federal MP Michelle Landry, State MP Brittany Lauga and Rockhampton mayor Margaret Strelow.

The centre held a Grand Opening promotional event on Saturday 19 November 2016 where Sea FM held an outside broadcast.  Novelty children's amusements were also offered at the event, including a petting zoo, face painting and balloon creations.

References

Buildings and structures in Rockhampton
Shopping centres in Queensland